Chobot is a municipality and village in Strakonice District in the South Bohemian Region of the Czech Republic. It has about 40 inhabitants.

Administrative parts
The village of Újezd u Skaličan is an administrative part of Chobot.

References

Villages in Strakonice District